Poague is a surname. Notable people with the surname include:

Henry Poague (1889–1953), American football coach 
William T. Poague (1835–1914), American Civil War veteran
Poague House

See also
Margaret E. Poague House